The FC Basel 1934–35 season was the forty-second season since the club was foundation on 15 November 1893. FC Basel played their home games in the Landhof in the district Wettstein in Kleinbasel. The club chairman Franz Rinderer, who was the president for the fourth consecutive season.

Overview 
The Austrian trainer Richard (Dombi) Kohn was appointed as the new FC Basel trainer. He followed his fellow Austrian Josef Haist, who had taken over after the death of Karl Kurz during the previous season. The team played a total of 38 matches in their 1934–35 season. 26 of these matches were in the Nationalliga, five matches were in the Swiss Cup and seven were friendly matches. Of these seven friendlies six were played in the Landhof and the other game was played away against Luzern. Of theses matches four ended with a victory. However the visiting teams Racing Club Paris, Manchester City and Rapid Wien proved to be too strong for the home team.

The 1934–35 Nationalliga had been again reformed. The number of teams had been reduced by two teams. The championship was contested by 14 teams and was played in a double round robin. Basel started the season well, winning nine of the first eleven games. However the second half of the season was not that good and the team slipped in the table. They finished the Nationalliga season in fifth position in the table, with 12 victories from the 26 games and 28 points. They were 13 points behind Lausanne-Sport, who won the championship. Otto Haftl was the Basel's best goal scorer with 21 goals, Alfred Jaeck second best with 13.

In the 1st principal round of the Swiss Cup Basel were drawn away against and defeated lower tier Bellinzona. In both the second and third round drawn at home against lower classed St. Gallen and Chiasso. The quarter-final was won at home against Lugano. In the semi-final Basel were drawn away against local rivals Nordstern Basel, but suffered a defeat. Lausanne-Sport won the final against Nordstern 10–0 and therefore they completed the national double.

Players 
The following is the list of the Basel first team squad during the season 1934–35. The list includes players that were in the squad the day the season started on 11 August 1934 but subsequently left the club after that date.

 

 

Players who left the squad

Results

Legend

Friendly matches

Pre-season

Mid- and end of season

Nationalliga

League matches

League table

Swiss Cup

See also 
 History of FC Basel
 List of FC Basel players
 List of FC Basel seasons

References

Sources 
 Rotblau: Jahrbuch Saison 2014/2015. Publisher: FC Basel Marketing AG. 
 Die ersten 125 Jahre. Publisher: Josef Zindel im Friedrich Reinhardt Verlag, Basel. 
 FCB team 1934/35 at fcb-archiv.ch
 Switzerland 1934/35 by Erik Garin at Rec.Sport.Soccer Statistics Foundation

External links
 FC Basel official site

FC Basel seasons
Basel